Marin Draganja (born 13 May 1991) is a Croatian professional tennis player and competes mainly on the ATP World Tour in doubles.

Draganja reached his highest ATP singles ranking, No. 550 on 29 April 2013, and his highest ATP doubles ranking, No. 20, on 6 April 2015. After having a hip surgery in August 2015 Draganja paused his career for recovery. Marin Draganja is currently coached by Gilbert Schaller and managed by the  McCartney Group, Vienna.

His younger brother is a professional tennis player  Tomislav Draganja.

ATP career finals

Doubles: 9 (4 titles, 5 runner-ups)

Challenger finals

Doubles: 16 (13–3)

References

External links
 
 

Croatian male tennis players
Tennis players from Split, Croatia
Living people
1991 births
Tennis players at the 2016 Summer Olympics
Olympic tennis players of Croatia
French Open junior champions
Grand Slam (tennis) champions in boys' doubles
21st-century Croatian people